Two ships of the Royal Navy have been named HMS Lobelia :

  an  sloop launched in 1916 and sold in 1920
 , a  launched in 1941 and transferred to the FNFL later that year under the same name. Returned to the Royal Navy in April 1947 and sold the following month for mercantile service

Royal Navy ship names